Smrekovica may refer to:

 Smrekovica, Bosnia and Herzegovina, a village near Breza
 Smrekovica massif, a mountain in the Branisko (mountain range), Slovakia